Ídolos Portugal (season 2) was the second season of Ídolos. Sérgio Lucas won over Raquel Guerra.

Finals

Finalists
(ages stated at time of contest)

Live show details

Heat 1 (13 October 2004)

Notes
Luciana Abreu and Gonçalo Oliveira advanced to the top 11 of the competition. The other 6 contestants were eliminated.
Helena Fernandes, Inês David and Nuno Lopes returned for a second chance at the top 11 in the Wildcard Round.

Heat 2 (20 October 2004)

Notes
Raquel Guerra and Daniela advanced to the top 11 of the competition. The other 6 contestants were eliminated.
André Pimenta, Ivo & Joana Mendia returned for a second chance at the top 11 in the Wildcard Round.

Heat 3 (27 October 2004)

Notes
Sérgio Lucas and Gabriela advanced to the top 11 of the competition. The other 6 contestants were eliminated.
Paulo and Ruben Louw returned for a second chance at the top 11 in the Wildcard Round.

Wildcard round (3 November 2004)

Notes
The judges selected Helena Fernandes and Ruben Louw to move on into the Top 11 of the competition, before the hosts revealed the Top 4 vote getters. Paulo and Nuno Lopes received the highest number of votes, and advanced to the top 11 of the competition.
André Pimenta won the Jury Joker, and completed the top 11.

Live Show 1 (19 November 2004)
Theme: My Idol

Live Show 2 (26 November 2004)
Theme: Portuguese Hits

Live Show 3 (3 December 2004)
Theme: Viewers' Choice

Live Show 4 (10 December 2004)
Theme: Disco Hits

Live Show 5 (17 December 2004)
Theme: 70s Hits

Live Show 6 (24 December 2004)
Theme: Love Songs

Live Show 7 (31 December 2004)
Theme: Hits of Madonna & Robbie Williams

Live Show 8: Semi-final (7 January 2005)
Theme: Film Hits

Live final (14 January 2005)

External links
Official Website via Web Archive

Ídolos (Portuguese TV series)
2004 Portuguese television seasons
2005 Portuguese television seasons